Tuvalu competed at the 2018 Commonwealth Games in the Gold Coast, Australia from April 4 to April 15, 2018.

Weightlifter Manuila Raobu was the island's flag bearer during the opening ceremony.

Competitors
The following is the list of number of competitors participating at the Games per sport/discipline.

Athletics

Tuvalu participated with 2 athletes (2 men).

Men
Track & road events

Field events

Swimming

Tuvalu participated with 1 athlete (1 man).

Men

Table tennis

Tuvalu participated with 3 athletes (2 men and 1 woman).

Singles

Doubles

Weightlifting

Tuvalu participated with 1 athlete (1 man).

See also
Tuvalu at the 2018 Summer Youth Olympics

References

Nations at the 2018 Commonwealth Games
Tuvalu at the Commonwealth Games
2018 in Tuvaluan sport